Ghostory (translated from Bakemonogatari) is the first part of the Japanese light novel series Monogatari.

Ghostory may also refer to:

Ghostory (album), a 2012 album by School of Seven Bells
Ghostory, a 2017 indie puzzle adventure game for PC

See also
Ghost story, fiction about ghosts